Kiwi Farms, formerly known as CWCki Forums, is an internet forum that facilitates the discussion and harassment of online figures and communities. Their targets are often subject to organized group trolling and stalking, as well as doxxing and real-life harassment. These actions have tied Kiwi Farms to the suicides of three people targeted by members of the forum. 

Kiwi Farms' connection to several controversies and harassment campaigns has caused the forum to be blocked by Internet service providers or refused service by companies. After the Christchurch mosque shootings, some Internet service providers in New Zealand blocked the site. In 2021, after the suicide of Near, a non-binary software developer who was subject to targeted and organised group harassment by members of the site, DreamHost stopped providing their domain registration services to Kiwi Farms. In September 2022, Kiwi Farms was blocked by Cloudflare due to "an imminent and emergency threat to human life". Following intermittent availability, The Daily Dot confirmed VanwaTech was providing content delivery network services to the site, which brought it back online.

In September 2022, Kiwi Farms suffered a data breach; the site operator told users to assume that IP addresses, email addresses, and passwords had been leaked.

History 

Kiwi Farms was founded in 2013 by Joshua Conner Moon (known as "Null" on the website), a former 8chan administrator. It was originally launched as a forum website to troll and harass a webcomic artist who was first noticed in 2007 on the Something Awful forums. Eventually, an Encyclopedia Dramatica page was created about the artist. A dedicated wiki, titled "CWCki" based on the artist's initials, was created by people who felt that the Encyclopedia Dramatica entry was not detailed or accurate enough. Kiwi Farms was originally called "CWCki Forums" before "Kiwi Farms" was coined in 2014. It now hosts threads targeting many individuals, including minorities, women, LGBT people, neurodivergent people, people considered by Kiwi Farms users to be mentally ill or sexually deviant, feminists, journalists, Internet celebrities, video game or comics hobbyists, and far-right personalities.

, the site had 16,000 daily logins, according to the site's administrators. Katelyn Burns, who had been targeted by the site, described its audience as "terminally online people from a wide range of political ideologies, from far right and anti-trans feminist types to edgy lefties obsessed with consuming internet drama", while noting that "of particular interest to many of the site’s users have been trans people, who they have labeled 'troons', a derogatory portmanteau of 'tranny' and 'goon'".

Harassment 
The targets of Kiwi Farms threads are often subject to organized group trolling, harassment, and stalking, including real-life harassment by users. The site targets transgender people, people with disabilities, those its users believe to be non-neurotypical, and members of the far-right. Tactics include publishing their victims' personal information ("doxxing"), trying to get them fired from their jobs, reporting crimes at their addresses in an attempt to have police dispatched to their homes ("swatting"), and harassing their family members and friends. Some of Kiwi Farms' harassment campaigns have continued for months or years, and some aim to drive the targets to suicide. Both the site's owner Moon and the userbase of Kiwi Farms have been described as antisemitic, with Kiwi Farms users targeting a transgender Jewish convert with antisemitic abuse.

Clara Sorrenti, a transgender activist and Twitch streamer under the name "Keffals", was doxxed on Kiwi Farms in a thread dedicated to discussing her. Users on the site posted personal information about her (e.g. addresses, phone numbers) as well as that of her friends and family. Users also leaked sexually explicit photos of her and made death threats. She was later swatted, arrested, and detained for over ten hours in August 2022 when someone stole her identity and sent fake emails to local politicians threatening mass violence. She was later cleared of any wrongdoing, and police acknowledged the incident as a swatting attempt. Users also posted the address of an unrelated man who lives in the same city and shares her last name, and police were also sent to his residence. After the swatting incident, Sorrenti said she moved out of her home and into a hotel for her safety. After she posted a photograph of her cat on the hotel bed, Kiwi Farms users identified the hotel from the bedsheets in the photograph, and sent multiple pizza orders to the hotel under her deadname. "Obviously, the pizza itself isn't the problem. It's the threat they send by telling me they know where I live and are willing to act on it in the real world," she said in a video after the incident. Sorrenti later fled the country after her location was identified again, reportedly by someone who hacked her Uber account. The incidents are being investigated as criminal harassment, and Sorrenti stated she intended to pursue legal action. Sorrenti also promoted a campaign to pressure Cloudflare into terminating its services to the website.

On August 24, 2022, U.S. Representative Marjorie Taylor Greene stated in an interview with NewsMax that she was swatted twice by an individual claiming to be Kiwifarms moderator "AltisticRight". She demanded that the website be shut down, saying "There should be no business or any kind of service where you can target your enemy. That's absolutely absurd and this is the type of lawlessness that Democrats want all over the country". Cloudflare suspended a service to the website that allowed them to customize error messages in response.

Terminations of service 
Kiwi Farms used services from Cloudflare, an American hosting and web security services provider. The services include DDoS protection, and distribution through Cloudflare's content delivery network. Following Kiwi Farms' harassment campaign against Sorrenti, in August 2022 a campaign was started to try to convince Cloudflare to stop providing services to the site. NBC News claims this was done in order to enable "debilitating virtual attacks" against Kiwi Farms. While Cloudflare initially defended their decision to keep working with Kiwi Farms, on September 3, 2022, Cloudflare officially blocked the site from using its services. People attempting to visit the site saw an error message explaining that the decision had been made due to "an imminent and emergency threat to human life". Cloudflare CEO Matthew Prince stated that the company acted because "the rhetoric on the Kiwifarms site and specific, targeted threats [had] escalated over the last 48 hours" at the time of the decision. Other middleware providers, such as hCaptcha, followed suit in halting support for Kiwi Farms.

Though the site was briefly offline due to Cloudflare's decision, it was back online "intermittently" on September 4, 2022, with the Russian-based service provider DDoS-Guard and a Russian domain that had been registered on July 12, 2021. Former FBI Assistant Director for Counterintelligence Frank Figliuzzi warned that by switching to Russian servers, Kiwi Farms "could easily become an increased threat of domestic terror". DDoS-Guard stopped providing services to Kiwi Farms on September 5, 2022, also rendering the site's Russian domain inaccessible. The Internet Archive excluded Kiwi Farms from being archived at the Wayback Machine during this time.

Moon has since claimed that the takedown of Kiwi Farms was "an organized attack", and that there is "a coalition of criminals trying to frame the forum for their behavior" which provides "opportunities for professional victims to amplify their message". Moon also commented that he did not see a realistic scenario for Kiwi Farms to stay online. On September 6, 2022, The Daily Dot confirmed that VanwaTech was providing content delivery network services to the site, hence bringing it back online. Other websites running on VanwaTech infrastructure experienced availability problems as a result, including The Daily Stormer and 8chan.

Suicides of harassment targets 
Harassment campaigns by Kiwi Farms users are known to have contributed to the suicides of three individuals. The Kiwi Farms community considers it a goal to drive its targets to suicide, and has celebrated such deaths with a counter on the website. They have used social media reporting systems to mass-report posts by harassment targets in which they have expressed suicidal thoughts or intentions, with the goal of reducing the possibility their targets receive help.

In 2013, American video game developer Chloe Sagal became a Kiwi Farms target after Eurogamer reported Sagal's Indiegogo crowdfunding campaign had been flagged for "suspicious activity". Sagal had raised over $30,000 on the platform for metal poisoning treatment to remove shrapnel from a car accident, but Eurogamer reported that Sagal had actually intended to use the proceeds for sex reassignment surgery. Sagal later died via self-immolation on June 19, 2018, which several reports attributed to years of harassment from Kiwi Farms.

Julie Terryberry, a Canadian woman, died by suicide in 2016 following sustained harassment from Kiwi Farms users. Following Terryberry's death, Joshua Moon posted a note on the forum claiming that Kiwi Farms and its users had no responsibility for suicide.

In a Twitter thread posted on June 27, 2021, Near, a pseudonymous Japan-based software developer known for their work on the video game emulator higan, described long-term harassment from Kiwi Farms users. Near, who was non-binary, said that they had endured lifelong bullying but that the abuse had recently centralized around Kiwi Farms which had "made the harassment orders of magnitude worse". Near stated that they and their friends had been doxxed and goaded into suicide by members of the website, and that Near had been mocked for being autistic. On June 28, Hector Martin posted a link to a Google Doc which he said came from a mutual friend of his and Near's, which said that Near had died by suicide, and alleged that the harassment from Kiwi Farms amounted to murder. Martin subsequently reported on June 28 that he had spoken to police who confirmed that Near had died the previous day. USA Today reported on July 23, 2021, that it had confirmed with Near's former employer that they had died.

Other controversies

Christchurch mosque shootings 
In March 2019, Kiwi Farms republished both the livestream and the manifesto of Brenton Tarrant, the perpetrator of the 2019 Christchurch mosque shootings. Shortly after, website owner Joshua Moon publicly denied a request by New Zealand Police to voluntarily hand over all data on posts about the shooting, including the email and IP addresses of posters. Moon responded aggressively and mockingly, calling New Zealand a "shithole country", and stated that he did not "give a single solitary fuck what section 50 of your faggot law says about sharing your email". He deemed the request a censorship attempt and argued that New Zealand authorities "do not have the legal reach to imprison everyone who's posted [the video]". Kiwi Farms was one of several websites blocked by New Zealand Internet service providers after the attack. In New Zealand, those who were caught possessing or sharing images or videos of the attack faced charges that could result in 14-year prison sentences.

Aztec High School shooting 

The perpetrator of the 2017 Aztec High School shooting, William Atchison, was a commenter on Kiwi Farms under the alias "FuckYou", as well as other websites including Encyclopedia Dramatica and the Blockland Forums. Two days before the shooting he posted an explicit sexual statement towards one of the perpetrators of the failed Halifax shooting plot, Lindsay Souvannarath, who herself had been an active member of Kiwi Farms before her arrest. After the name of the perpetrator was publicly released, Joshua Moon opened up two threads for discussing the shooting and collecting information on the shooter and his online accounts for the purpose of mocking him. The forum’s research was utilized and cited by counseling psychologist and author Peter F. Langman, an expert on school shootings, for his documentation on Atchison’s online activity.

My Immortal fan fiction authorship 

In 2017, Tumblr user and young adult fiction writer Rose Christo claimed that she had authored the Harry Potter fan fiction My Immortal, which, Christo said, she had written in order to find her missing brother. She announced that Macmillan Publishers was publishing a memoir, Under the Same Stars: The Search for My Brother and the True Story of My Immortal, about the fan fiction's creation as well as her childhood of abuse and experiences as a Native American in the New York foster care system. A forum thread concerning Christo and discussing her claims was created on Kiwi Farms. Christo's brother responded to the Kiwi Farms thread, saying that her story was nearly entirely false, including their Native American ancestry, their having gone to foster care, and her quest to locate her brother, which formed the center of the memoir. Christo then admitted that she had falsified documents supporting her story, but maintained that she had written My Immortal. Macmillan Publishers canceled the publication of her memoir.

References

External links

2010s in Internet culture
2020s in Internet culture
Ableism
Alt-tech
American websites
Conspiracist media
Cyberbullying
Discrimination against LGBT people
Discrimination against transgender people
Internet culture
Internet forums
Internet properties established in 2013
Internet trolling
Internet-related controversies
Tor onion services
Stalking
Websites with far-right material